This is a list of banks in Lebanon.

List of banks

Central bank
 Banque du Liban (BDL)

List of Banks 

Lebanese based banks sorted by their significant presence domestically and overseas:

 Bank Audi
 Byblos Bank
 Bank of Beirut
 Bank of Beirut and Arab Countries
 BankMed
 Banque Libano-Française
 BLOM Bank
 BSL Bank
 Cedrus Bank
 Creditbank
 Crédit Libanais
 First National Bank
 Fransabank
 Intercontinental Bank of Lebanon (IBL)
 Lebanon and Gulf Bank
 Saradar Bank
 Bank of Beirut
 Société Générale de Banque au Liban (SGBL)
 Lebanese Swiss Bank
 AM Bank (Al-Mawarid Bank)
 Lebanese Canadian Bank
 Jammal Trust Bank
 CSCBank 
 Intra Bank
 Fenicia Bank

Foreign banks
 Citi
 Arab Bank
 Banca di Roma
 National Bank of Kuwait (Lebanon)

Closed banks 

 Al-Madina Bank

See also
 Economy of Lebanon
 List of banks in the Arab world

External links
 Banking in Lebanon

 
Banks
Lebanon
Business in Lebanon
Lebanon